Otago University Press is an academic publisher associated with the University of Otago. The press is located in Dunedin, New Zealand. The Otago University Press is the oldest academic publisher in Aotearoa New Zealand. The Otago University Press publishes non-fiction and poetry and is also the publisher of the literary journal Landfall.

Otago University Press has published award-winning books, including Tumble by Joannna Preston, winner of the 2022 Ockham Award for Poetry.

The press is currently a member of the Association of University Presses.

References

University of Otago
Academic publishing companies
Book publishing companies of New Zealand
University presses of New Zealand